The 2015–16 Akron Zips women's basketball team represents the University of Akron during the 2015–16 NCAA Division I women's basketball season. The Zips, led by 10th year head coach Jodi Kest, play their home games at the James A. Rhodes Arena as members of the East Division of the Mid-American Conference. They finished the season 19–14, 11–7 in MAC play to finish in second place in the East Division. They advanced to the quarterfinals of the MAC women's tournament where they lost to Buffalo. They were invited to the Women's National Invitation Tournament where they lost in the first round to Bucknell.

Roster

Schedule and results
Source: 

|-
!colspan=9 style="background:#C29C41; color:#000E41;"| Exhibition

|-
!colspan=9 style="background:#C29C41; color:#000E41;"| Non-conference games

|-
!colspan=9 style="background:#C29C41; color:#000E41;"| MAC regular season

|-
!colspan=9 style="background:#C29C41; color:#000E41;"| MAC Women's Tournament

|-
!colspan=9 style="background:#C29C41; color:#000E41;"| WNIT

See also
2015–16 Akron Zips men's basketball team

References
2015–16 Akron Zips Statistics

Akron Zips women's basketball seasons
Akron
2016 Women's National Invitation Tournament participants